Martina Hingis and Arantxa Sánchez-Vicario were the defending champions but did not compete that year.

Serena Williams and Venus Williams won in the final 5–7, 6–1, 6–3 against Mariaan de Swardt and Elena Tatarkova.

Seeds
Champion seeds are indicated in bold text while text in italics indicates the round in which those seeds were eliminated.

 Lindsay Davenport /  Natasha Zvereva (first round)
 Alexandra Fusai /  Nathalie Tauziat (first round)
 Lisa Raymond /  Rennae Stubbs (quarterfinals)
 Yayuk Basuki /  Caroline Vis (first round)

Draw

External links
 1998 Swisscom Challenge Doubles draw

Zurich Open
1998 WTA Tour